In mathematics, the Poincaré inequality is a result in the theory of Sobolev spaces, named after the French mathematician Henri Poincaré. The inequality allows one to obtain bounds on a function using bounds on its derivatives and the geometry of its domain of definition. Such bounds are of great importance in the modern, direct methods of the calculus of variations. A very closely related result is Friedrichs' inequality.

Statement of the inequality

The classical Poincaré inequality

Let p, so that 1 ≤ p < ∞ and Ω a subset bounded at least in one direction. Then there exists a constant C, depending only on Ω and p, so that, for every function u of the Sobolev space W01,p(Ω) of zero-trace (a.k.a. zero on the boundary) functions,

Poincaré–Wirtinger inequality

Assume that 1 ≤ p ≤ ∞ and that Ω is a bounded connected open subset of the n-dimensional Euclidean space ℝn with a Lipschitz boundary (i.e., Ω is a Lipschitz domain). Then there exists a constant C, depending only on Ω and p, such that for every function u in the Sobolev space ,

where

is the average value of u over Ω, with |Ω| standing for the Lebesgue measure of the domain Ω. When Ω is a ball, the above inequality is
called a -Poincaré inequality; for more general domains Ω, the above is more familiarly known as a Sobolev inequality.

The necessity to subtract the average value can be seen by considering constant functions for which the derivative is zero while, without subtracting the average, we can have the integral of the function as large as we wish. There are other conditions instead of subtracting the average that we can require in order to deal with this issue with constant functions, for example, requiring trace zero, or subtracting the average over some proper subset of the domain. The constant C in the Poincare inequality may be different from condition to condition. Also note that the issue is not just the constant functions, because it is the same as saying that adding a constant value to a function can increase its integral while the integral of its derivative remains the same. So, simply excluding the constant functions will not solve the issue.

Generalizations

In the context of metric measure spaces, the definition of a Poincaré inequality is slightly different. One definition is: a metric measure space supports a (q,p)-Poincare inequality for some  if there are constants C and  so that for each ball B in the space,

Here we have an enlarged ball in the right hand side. In the context of metric measure spaces,  is the minimal p-weak upper gradient of u in the sense of 
Heinonen and Koskela.

Whether a space supports a Poincaré inequality has turned out to have deep connections to the geometry and analysis of the space.  For example, Cheeger has shown that a doubling space satisfying a Poincaré inequality admits a notion of differentiation.  Such spaces include sub-Riemannian manifolds and Laakso spaces.

There exist other generalizations of the Poincaré inequality to other Sobolev spaces.  For example, consider the Sobolev space H1/2(T2), i.e. the space of functions u in the L2 space of the unit torus T2 with Fourier transform û satisfying

In this context, the Poincaré inequality says: there exists a constant C such that, for every  with u identically zero on an open set ,

Yet another generalization involves weighted Poincaré inequalities where the Lebesgue measure is replaced by a weighted version.

The Poincaré constant

The optimal constant C in the Poincaré inequality is sometimes known as the Poincaré constant for the domain Ω. Determining the Poincaré constant is, in general, a very hard task that depends upon the value of p and the geometry of the domain Ω. Certain special cases are tractable, however. For smooth functions, this can be understood as an application of the isoperimetric inequality to the function's level sets. In one dimension, this is Wirtinger's inequality for functions.

However, in some special cases the constant C can be determined concretely. For example, for p = 2, it is well known that over the domain of unit isosceles right triangle, C = 1/π ( < d/π where ).

Furthermore, for a smooth, bounded domain , since the Rayleigh quotient for the Laplace operator in the space  is minimized by the eigenfunction corresponding to the minimal eigenvalue  of the (negative) Laplacian, it is a simple consequence that, for any ,

and furthermore, that the constant λ1 is optimal.

See also
Friedrichs' inequality
Korn's inequality
Spectral gap

References

 

Theorems in analysis
Inequalities
Sobolev spaces
Inequality